"Boulder to Birmingham" is a song written by Emmylou Harris and Bill Danoff which first appeared on Harris's 1975 album Pieces of the Sky. It has served as something of a signature tune for the artist and recounts her feelings of grief in the years following the death of country rock star and mentor Gram Parsons. Early in her career, Harris toured with Gram Parsons and sang on his two solo albums GP  and the posthumously released Grievous Angel. The song is known for its chorus "I would rock my soul in the bosom of Abraham/I would hold my life in his saving grace/I would walk all the way from Boulder to Birmingham/If I thought I could see, I could see your face." Harris did not write again about Parsons' death in such a direct way until "The Road", a track from her 2011 album Hard Bargain, although "Michelangelo" from Red Dirt Girl certainly appears to be about Parsons too.

Bill Danoff recorded the song with his group, the Starland Vocal Band, on their self-titled debut album. A version of the song was a hit in New Zealand for The Hollies, reaching number ten there, and later appeared on their album A Crazy Steal. A version was recorded in 1975 by Scott Walker and The Walker Brothers on their No Regrets album. In 2012, American alternative rock band, The Fray, released a cover of the song featuring Harris as a bonus track on their record, Scars & Stories.

Cover versions 
Dolly Parton included a cover on the song on her 1976 All I Can Do album.

Joan Baez cut a live version of the song and it originally appeared on her 1976 live album From Every Stage; the track later appeared in the compilation Joan Baez: The Complete A&M Recordings (released September 23, 2003).

The song also appeared in a 1984 episode of The Dukes of Hazzard titled "Play It Again, Luke" in which it was sung by actor Tom Wopat as Luke and guest star Roberta Leighton as country singer and a former flame of Luke's named Candy Dix.

Jim Horn recorded a version of the song on his 2012 album Children of the Universe featuring Renee Armand on vocals.

For their 2012 album Scars & Stories, American rock band The Fray recorded a version of the song, and Harris appears on the track as a featured artist.

Aoife O'Donovan included a live version of the song on her album Man in a Neon Coat (Live from Cambridge).

The Wailin' Jennys covered the song on their 2017 album Fifteen.

In 2019 the song appeared in the film Wild Rose sung by Jessie Buckley.

References

External links
 Emmylou Harris Official Site
 Emmylou Harris: The Sweetheart of the Rodeo – An excellent biography by Bill DeYoung containing a background to the song.
 http://www.juno.co.uk/products/boulder-to-birmingham/406383-01/

1975 songs
1976 singles
Emmylou Harris songs
The Walker Brothers songs
The Hollies songs
Country ballads
Vehicle wreck ballads
Songs written by Bill Danoff